Puertocito is a populated place situated in Pima County, Arizona, United States, near the border with Mexico.

References

Populated places in Pima County, Arizona